Dichomeris indigna is a moth in the family Gelechiidae. It was described by Walsingham in 1892. It is found in Puerto Rico.

References

Moths described in 1892
indigna